Bellasylva (also Bella Sylva) is an unincorporated community in Forkston Township, Wyoming County, Pennsylvania, United States.

Notes

Unincorporated communities in Wyoming County, Pennsylvania
Unincorporated communities in Pennsylvania